Tamaki railway station was a station on the North Island Main Trunk in New Zealand.

See also 
 List of Auckland railway stations

References

Defunct railway stations in New Zealand